Robert Jackson (born October 10, 1958) is a former American football safety in the National Football League (NFL). He was drafted by the Cincinnati Bengals in the 11th round of the 1981 NFL Draft. He played college football at Central Michigan.

References

1958 births
Living people
American football safeties
Central Michigan Chippewas football players
Cincinnati Bengals players
People from Ottawa County, Michigan
Players of American football from Michigan